The Jinghong Dam is a gravity dam composed of roller-compacted concrete on the Lancang (Mekong) River near Jinghong in Yunnan Province, China. The main purpose of the dam is hydroelectric power production and it has an associated 1,750 MW power station. Part of the power generated is sold to Thailand under an agreement with China.

 it is the nearest Chinese dam upstream of the Thai border, and has helped to cause huge fluctuations in river levels, affecting people's livelihoods downstream by disrupting the river's natural cycle. It, along with the many other dams on the river, is exacerbating the effects of climate change and impacting the ecosystem, disturbing the migratory patterns of fish as well as riverbank plants and local agriculture downstream.

See also 

 List of power stations in China

References

Hydroelectric power stations in Yunnan
Dams in China
Dams in the Mekong River Basin
Gravity dams
Dams completed in 2008
Roller-compacted concrete dams
Buildings and structures in Xishuangbanna Dai Autonomous Prefecture